Dalibor Božac (born 3 June 1976) is a Croatian retired football defender.

External links
Dalibor Božac profile at Nogometni Magazin 

1976 births
Living people
Sportspeople from Pula
Association football defenders
Croatian footballers
Croatia youth international footballers
NK Istra players
HNK Hajduk Split players
NK Pomorac 1921 players
NK Slaven Belupo players
NK Istra 1961 players
NK Međimurje players
Croatian Football League players
First Football League (Croatia) players